Jeff Martin is a fictional character from the ABC soap opera All My Children. He is the oldest son of Joseph "Joe" Martin Sr. and his deceased wife, Helen Martin. Dr. Jeff Martin was played by Christopher Wines, Charles Frank, Robert Perault, James O'Sullivan, Jeffrey Byron, John Tripp, and John James.

Casting

Storylines 
Dr. Joe Martin left California following the death of his wife Helen to return to his native Pine Valley, Pennsylvania with children Jeff, Tara, and Bobby (The character of Bobby was later dropped from the show.)  to live with his mother, Kate Martin.

While in medical school Jeff fell in love with Pine Valley resident Erica Kane. The two married and Erica began to pursue a modeling career. Money problems arose, Erica became very bored with Jeff's long hours and lack of money and both began to stray from their marriage.

Erica became pregnant. This could have been a career-ending situation, so she chose to have an abortion behind Jeff's back. Although Jeff was livid, he chose to stick out his marriage.  While Erica was in the hospital, Jeff met nurse Mary Kennicott.

Unable to resolve their differences, Jeff and Erica divorced. Jeff moved on to Mary and soon remarried. They took in a young boy named Thaddeus Gardner, who had been pushed from a moving vehicle by his father Ray Garner. When Mary was murdered during a home invasion, Jeff relinquished custody to his father and stepmother, Joe and Ruth Martin.

Jeff found happiness again with Christina Karras, a fellow doctor at Pine Valley Hospital. Christina was engaged to Dr. David Thorton. When he was murdered, Jeff helped Christina clear her name and the two married and left Pine Valley.

Jeff returned to Pine Valley in 2006 when informed by his father Joe that the child they believed Erica had aborted was alive and now in Pine Valley. Jeff attempted to reach out to his son, Josh and in the process rekindled a romance with Erica.

Shortly after Jeff's arrival, Dr. Madden was found murdered. Jeff and Erica had been at odds about whether or not to divulge the truth to Josh, but in his grief, it seemed the perfect time to comfort him as only parents could. Josh didn't receive the news well, and was torn between hating the man who created him, and loving that same man for having treated him like a true son. At first he wanted no part of his real family, and cast doubtful eyes on those he thought might have killed Greg Madden. He was also very smitten with Babe Chandler, something that Erica hated because of what she had done to Bianca.

Finding out they had a son brought Erica and Jeff close again, and their interaction in dealing with Josh began to affect her marriage to Jack. When Erica moved into the Valley Inn for some 'me' time, and failed to return, Jack had her belongings delivered to her hotel room door. Jeff felt encouraged that perhaps he might win Erica back when he began suffering from bouts of malaria and she climbed into bed with him to help quell his fevered shivering.

Josh eventually eased into a relationship with both Erica and Jeff, and escorted his 'new mother' home to spend Christmas with Jack and the family. After a short-lived affair with Erica, Jeff decided to return to his work in Africa.

References

External links
Jeff Martin – Who's Who In Pine Valley

All My Children characters
Fictional physicians
Television characters introduced in 1970
Male characters in television